The first IPC Ice Sledge Hockey World Championships was held March, 1996 Nynäshamn, Sweden. Participating countries: Canada, Estonia, Japan, Norway, Sweden and United States. Japan made its debut at the World Championship.

Final rankings
 ( Rosters are not yet complete )

Tournament

Tournament summary 

 11 - 1 
 ( SWE: Jan Edbom 5, Göran Karlsson 2, Leif Wahlstedt 2, Mats Nyman 1, Jens Kask 1 USA: Wayne C Lindsey 1 )

 15 - 0 
 ( NOR: Atle Haglund 5, Rolf Einar Pedersen 3, Eskil Hagen 1, Kjetl Korbu Nielsen 1, Helge Björnstad 1, Rolf Öjen 1, Morten Syversen 1 )

 21 - 0 
 ( SWE: Jan Edbom 8, Mats Nyman 4, Göran Karlsson 4, Jens Kask 3, Bengt-Gösta Johansson 2 )

 0 - 5 
 ( CAN: John May 2, Dean Mellway 2, Lou Mulvihill 1 )

 11 - 0 
 ( NOR: Helge Björnstad 4, Eskil Hagen 2, Rolf Einar Pedersen 2, Atle Haglund 1, Erik Sandbraaten 1, Morten Syversen 1 )

 4 - 1 
 ( SWE: Mats Nyman 3, Jan Edbom 1 EST: Viktor Karlenko 1 )

 4 - 1 
 ( NOR: Helge Björnstad 3, Eskil Hagen 1 EST: Viktor Artemjev 1 )

 10 - 0 
 ( CAN: Dean Mellway 3, Dave Earner 2, Pat Griffin 1, Jean Labonté 1, Angelo Gavilluci 1, John May 1 )

 1 - 1 
 ( CAN: Lou Mulvihill 1 NOR: Helge Björnstad 1 )

 8 - 1 
 ( EST: Jün Tammleht 3, Kaido Kalm 2, Viktor Karlenko 2, Viktor Artemjev 1 JPN: Mamoru Yoshikawa 1 )

 0 - 3 
 ( USA: Wayne Chuck Lindsey 1, Thomas F Mc Nally 1, Joseph M Wilson 1 )

 3 - 0 
 ( CAN: Dean Mellway 2, Jean Labonté 1 )

 4 - 1 
 ( SWE: Jan Edbom 2, Mats Nyman 1, Jens Kask 1 NOR: Kjetil Korbu Nielsen 1 )

 5 - 1 
 ( EST: Jüri Tammeleht 2, Kaido Kalm 1, Leonid Zubov 1, Viktor Karlenko 1  USA: William Michael Kult 1 )

 1 - 1 
 ( SWE: Jocke Larsson 1 CAN: Dean Mellway 1 )

Semifinals  
 7 - 1 
 ( SWE: Jens Kask 3, Jan Edbom 2, Bengt-Gösta Johansson 1, Jock Larsson 1 EST: Viktor Karlenko 1 )

 2 - 1 
 ( NOR: Eskil Hagen 2 CAN: Dean Mellway 1 )

3rd-place match 

 3 - 1 
 (CAN: Lou Mulvihill 1, Dean Mellway 1, Pat Griffin 1 EST: Jüri Tammleht 1 )

Final

 3 - 2 
 (SWE: Jan Edbom 2, Göran Karlsson 1 NOR: Atle Haglund 1, Eskil Hagen 1 )

1996 World All Star Team
 Manuel Guerra Jr. (mv)- all-star goaltender
 Eskil Hagen
 Helge Björnstad
 Jan Edbom
 Pat Griffin
 Jüri Tammleht

See also
 Ice sledge hockey
 Ice hockey#Sledge hockey
 Ice sledge hockey at the 2006 Winter Paralympics
 2000 IPC Ice Sledge Hockey World Championships
 2004 IPC Ice Sledge Hockey World Championships
 2008 IPC Ice Sledge Hockey World Championships

External links
 Results (Swedish)

IPC Ice Sledge Hockey World Championships
World Para Ice Hockey Championships
International ice hockey competitions hosted by Sweden
1995–96 in Swedish ice hockey
March 1996 sports events in Europe
Sport in Nynäshamn